South Asia Analysis Group (SAAG) is a non-profit think tank based in India which conducts public interest and advocacy work. The group consists of Indian academics and former government officials. The self-stated objectives of the group include advancing strategic analysis, promoting public understanding, and contributing to the expansion of knowledge of security internationally and with regard to India. The group further says it "seeks to address the decision makers,  strategic planners, academics and the media in South Asia and the world at large."

Work
The scope of SAAG's work encompasses Afghanistan, Bangladesh, India, Pakistan, China, Iraq, Nepal, Sri Lanka and  Fiji.

SAAG's website hosts articles provided on political and strategic analysis. The site hosts notes, analysis, papers and updates on a broad range of aspects of Indian security issues and international relations. It includes access to news updates from the regions of interest and a collection of discussion papers published since 1998 by authors from the South Asian continent. Key topics of the papers include: terrorism, international security, Indian politics and political parties, weapons of mass destruction and connection between radical Islam and terrorism.

Analysts
A few of the analysts are:
Bahukutumbi Raman (retired Additional Secretary, Cabinet Secretariat, Govt. of India, and former Director of the Institute for Topical Studies, Chennai)
S. Gopal (former Special Secretary, Govt. of India)
Dr. S. Chandrasekharan, (retired Secretary, Govt. of India)
C.S. Kuppuswamy (former Director of the Cabinet Secretariat, Govt. of India)
Dr Subhash Kapila (former Indian diplomat to Japan and United States)
Col. R. Hariharan (Distinguished fellow, Chennai centre of China Studies)
R. Upadhyay
D S Rajan
Bhaskar Roy
Dr. Parasaran Rangarajan (former Adviser with the United Nations and the International Court of Justice, Editor-in-chief for the International Law Journal of London)
R M Panda

Recurring guest columnists include
Dr Rajesh Tembarai Krishnamachari
Dr V Suryanarayan
Kazi Anwarul Masud
Kumar David
Dr Charles Sarvan
Prof B R Deepak

See also 
 List of think tanks in India

References

External links

Think tanks based in India
Non-profit organisations based in India
Foreign policy and strategy think tanks in India